Shuya is the name of several inhabited localities in Russia.

Urban localities
Shuya, Ivanovo Oblast, a town in Ivanovo Oblast

Rural localities
Shuya, Republic of Karelia, a settlement in Prionezhsky District of the Republic of Karelia
Shuya, Okulovsky District, Novgorod Oblast, a village under the administrative jurisdiction of the urban-type settlement of Uglovka in Okulovsky District of Novgorod Oblast
Shuya, Valdaysky District, Novgorod Oblast, a village in Roshchinskoye Settlement of Valdaysky District of Novgorod Oblast
Shuya, Tver Oblast, a village in Rameshkovsky District of Tver Oblast